Casper and the Angels is an American animated television series based on the Harvey Comics cartoon character Casper the Friendly Ghost, produced by Hanna-Barbera Productions and broadcast on NBC from September 22, 1979, to December 15, 1979.

Plot 
Casper the Friendly Ghost is a "guardian ghost" to two female Space Police officers named Mini (who is a rather ditzy redhead) and Maxi (who is a much more intelligent African-American woman with a very short temper) who patrol the Jetsons-style Space City on their flying motorcycles in the year 2179.

They are joined by the rambunctious but good-hearted Hairy Scary, a large, shaggy, thousand year old ghost with a red nose and big bow tie who enjoys scaring people, especially villains and other troublemakers, but because he has a great deal of affection for his little pal Casper he, unlike most of their ghostly kind, tries to accept the fact that the gentle ghost does not like to scare people.

Less accepting, especially toward Mini and Maxi, are their fellow officers Nerdley and Fungo, a pair of bumbling, flying patrol car-driving male chauvinists who are always trying to prove that they are superior to their female counterparts, only to have their efforts undone by their own stupidity and cowardice.

History 
The show was apparently Hanna-Barbera's second attempt to cash in on the popularity of Charlie's Angels as well as the popularity of the motorcycle police drama CHiPs, the first being Captain Caveman and the Teen Angels on ABC. 

Twenty-six 15-minute segments shown as thirteen 30-minute episodes were produced, as well as two television specials Casper's Halloween Special and Casper's First Christmas. 

The series was shown on Cartoon Network and Boomerang for a few years and rarely found on television since 2003 or even earlier.  Some of the episodes can be found on YouTube.

Like many animated series created by Hanna-Barbera in the 1970s, the show contained a laugh track.

Cast 
 Julie McWhirter as Casper The Friendly Ghost
 John Stephenson as Hairy Scary The Ghost / Commander
 Diana McCannon as Space Patrol Officer Maxi
 Laurel Page as Space Patrol Officer Mini
 Hal Smith as Nerdley
 Paul Winchell as Fungo

Additional voices
 Rick Dees
 Bob Hastings
 Jim MacGeorge
 Ronnie Schell
 Frank Welker

Episodes

Home media
On September 5, 1995, Turner Home Entertainment released two volumes The Boo Zoo and Stars & Frights on VHS. This release contained five episodes from the series. In addition, on August 22, 2000, Warner Home Video released Casper Saves Halloween on VHS, which contained the Halloween special as well as six 15-minute episodes of Casper and the Angels.

Production credits
The credits features voices from the show, plus the same animators and part of the same music from Scooby-Doo and Scrappy-Doo and The World's Greatest Super Friends on ABC.
 Executive Producers: William Hanna and Joseph Barbera
 Producers: Art Scott and Alex Lovy
 Directors: Ray Patterson, Carl Urbano, Oscar Dufau, George Gordon
 Story Supervisor: Jim Ryan
 Story Editor: Bob Ogle
 Story: Jack Bonestell, Patsy Cameron, Gary Greenfield, Bob Ogle, Dick Robbins
 Story Direction: Don Christensen, Sukhdev Dail, George Singer
 Recording Director: Art Scott
 Voices: Rick Dees, Bob Hastings, Diann McCannon, Jim MacGeorge, Julie McWhirter, Laurel Page, Ronnie Schell, Hal Smith, John Stephenson, Frank Welker, Paul Winchell
 Graphics: Iraj Paran, Tom Wogatzke
 Title Design: Don Sheppard
 Musical Director: Hoyt Curtin
 Musical Supervisor: Paul DeKorte
 Creative Producer: Iwao Takamoto
 Design Supervisor: Bob Singer
 Character Design: Willie Ito, Scott Shaw
 Layout Supervisor: Don Morgan
 Key Layout: Floyd Norman
 Layout: John Bruno, Al Budnick, Nino Carbe, Dave Hanan, Linda Harris, Gary Hoffman, Carol Lay, Jack Manning, Alex McCrae, Floyd Norman, Paul Power, Becky Price, Tony Rivera, Glenn Schmitz, Scott Shaw
 Animation Supervisors: Bob Goe, Bill Keil, Jay Sarbry
 Animation: Robert Alvarez, Frank Andrina, Colin Baker, Anne Marie Bardwell, Ed Barge, Tom Barnes, Maxwell Becraft, Bob Bemiller, Richard Bowman, Bob Bransford, James Brummett, Oliver Callahan, Rudy Cataldi, Roger Chiasson, Steve Clark, Richard Coleman, John Conning, Jesse Cosio, Gabor Csupo, Zeon Davush, Daniel De La Vega, Elaine Despins, Charlie Downs, Joan Drake, Judith Ann Drake, Marcia Fertig, Gail Finkedlei, Hugh Fraser, Al Gaivoto, Charles Gammage, Miguel Garcia, Fernando Gonzalez, Jeff Hall, Terry Harrison, Bob Hathcock, Fred Hellmich, Charles Howell, Bill Hutten, Volus Jones, Mario Julio, Aundre Knutson, Rick Leon, Teresa Loewy, Hicks Lokey, Michael Longden, Ernesto Lopez, Tony Love, Mircea Mantta, Mauro Maressa, Duncan Marjoribanks, Burt Medall, Tran Vu Minh, Ken Muse, Constantin Mustatea, Sean Newton, Margaret Nichols, Eduardo Olivares, Margaret Parkes, Lester Pegues, Jr., Delpino Ramirez, Harry Rasmussen, William Recinos, Morey Reden, Mitch Rochon, Tom Ruegger, Joel Seibel, Mark Simon, Ken Southworth, Leo Sullivan, Robert Taylor, Barry Temple, Dave Tendlar, Dick Thompson, Richard Trueblood, Robert Tyler, Carlos Vincenzi, John Walker, Allen Wilzbach
 Assistant Animation Supervisor: Rick Leon
 Background Supervisor: Al Gmuer
 Backgrounds: Lorraine Andrina, Fernando Arce, Greg Battes, Dario Campanile, Gil DiCicco, Dennis Durrell, Fla Ferreira, Martin Forte, Bob Gentle, Al Gmuer, Bonnie Goodknight, Bonnie Goodknight, Ann Guenther, Tom Hanes, James Hedgeus, Eric Heschong, Jim Hickey, Mike Humphries, Andy Phillipson, Bill Proctor, Vivien Rhyan, Jeff Richards, Jeff Riche, Cal Titus, Dennis Venizelos
 Checking and Scene Planning: Cindy Smith
 Xerography: Star Wirth
 Ink and Paint Supervisor: Alison Victory
 Sound Direction: Richard Olson, Bill Getty
 Camera: Jerry Mills, Ross Avery, Bob Berry, Allen Childs, Marc Debbaudt, Candy Edwards, Curt Hall, Mike Kane, Neil Viker, Roy Wade, Brandy Whittington, Jerry Whittington
 Supervising Film Editor: Larry C. Cowan
 Dubbing Supervisor: Pat Foley
 Music Editor: Joe Sandusky
 Effects Editors: Julie Bagdonas, Sue Brown
 Show Editor: Gil Iverson
 Negative Consultant: William E. DeBoer
 Production Manager: Jayne Barbera
 Post Production Supervisor: Joed Eaton
 A HANNA-BARBERA PRODUCTION
 Based on the character owned and copyrighted by Harvey Cartoons, a partnership.
 This picture has made the jurdisction of I.A.T.SE., affiliated with A.F.L.-C.I.O.
 © 1979 Hanna-Barbera Productions, Inc.

See also 
 Casper's Halloween Special
 Casper's First Christmas

References

External links 
 
 

Harvey Comics series and characters
NBC original programming
1979 American television series debuts
1979 American television series endings
1970s American animated television series
Television series by Hanna-Barbera
American animated television spin-offs
Television series set in the future
Television series set in the 22nd century
Animated television series about ghosts
English-language television shows
American children's animated space adventure television series
American children's animated comic science fiction television series
American children's animated science fantasy television series
American children's animated horror television series
American children's animated mystery television series